Japanese boy band NEWS has released twelve studio albums, one compilation album, twenty-six singles, and ten concert videos.

Albums

Studio albums

Compilation albums

Singles

DVD singles

Videography

Concert videos

References

Discographies of Japanese artists
Pop music group discographies